Energy Orchard was the self-titled, debut album from Northern Ireland-based rock band, Energy Orchard, and was released in 1990.

Track listing 
All tracks composed by Bap Kennedy; except where noted.
 "Belfast" (Joby Fox) – 4:56
 "Somebody's Brother" – 6:42
 "Lion" – 4:48
 "One, Two Brown Eyes" (Van Morrison) – 3:53
 "King of Love" – 4:11
 "Sailortown" – 4:10
 "Walk In Love" – 3:02
 "This House Must Fall" – 3:47
 "Sweet Irish Rose" – 3:52
 "Hard Street" – 4:56
 "Good Day to Die" – 4:15
 "Belfast" - Instrumental- (Joby Fox) – 1:52

Personnel
Energy Orchard
Bap Kennedy - lead vocals, rhythm guitar, 12-string guitar, harmonica; lead guitar on "One, Two Brown Eyes"
Paul Toner - lead guitar, backing vocals
Spade McQuade - rhythm guitar, backing vocals
Joby Fox - bass, backing vocals; acoustic guitar on "Belfast" instrumental
Kevin Breslin - keyboards; bodhrán on "Somebody's Brother"
David Toner - drums, percussion
Technical
Clare Muller - front cover photography

References 

1990 debut albums
Energy Orchard albums
MCA Records albums